Mill Dam is a wetland in western Shapinsay, in Orkney, Scotland.

This water body was not shown on the 1840 survey map of the island, since it is a man-made creation from a damming in the 1880s. Mill Dam is fed by a stream flowing from the north that rises on the western lobe of Shapinsay. The pH levels of the outflow stream of Mill Dam are moderately alkaline, in the range of 9.18. The Mill Dam wetland is a significant bird habitat and is owned and managed by the Royal Society for the Protection of Birds.

See also
Balfour Castle
Burroughston Broch
The Ouse
Vasa Loch

Footnotes

External links
Shapinsay Island, Orkney

Dams in Scotland
Wetlands of Scotland
Landforms of Orkney
Shapinsay
Royal Society for the Protection of Birds reserves in Scotland